Niumaia Korovata, also known by the nickname of "Horse", is a Fijian former dual-code international rugby union and rugby league footballer who played in the 1990s and 2000s. Niumaia Korovata now is retired from playing and is living with his wife and 4 children. Anna, Ruth, Grace and only son Niumaia jnr.

Playing career
Korovata is from Ra Province.

He originally played rugby union for the Police club, and played nine games, including three test matches, for Fiji in 1990 and 1991.

Korovata then switched codes to rugby league. He joined the Yanco Wamoon Hawks in the Group 20 Rugby League competition, winning premierships with the team in 1994, 1995 and 1996. In 1995 he also represented the NSW Country sevens side. He also won the club's Best and Fairest award in 1996. From Group 20 he was selected as part of the Fijian 1995 World Cup squad and played in two matches at the tournament.

In 2005 Korovata was part of the Yanco Wamoon reserve grade side that lost the Reserve grade grand final.

References

Living people
Fijian rugby league players
Fiji national rugby league team players
Rugby league locks
Rugby league wingers
Rugby league centres
Rugby union wings
Fijian rugby union players
Fiji international rugby union players
People from Ra Province
Fijian police officers
Dual-code rugby internationals
I-Taukei Fijian people
Year of birth missing (living people)